Darryl Lamont Barnes (born April 21, 1965) is a Democratic member of the Maryland House of Delegates. Barnes has represented Maryland's 25th District since 2015. Barnes has also been serving at Deputy Majority Whip since 2017. He was previously the Chair of Legislative Black Caucus of Maryland from 2018 to 2022.

Early life and career
Barnes was born in Washington, D.C. on April 21, 1965. He attended High Point High School in Beltsville, Maryland and graduated from California State University, Long Beach with a degree in computer information systems. He is a small business owner, serving as the President of Barnes International, Ltd. since 2003.

In the legislature
Barnes was sworn into the Maryland House of Delegates on January 14, 2015.

In December 2016, state senator Ulysses Currie announced that he would not seek re-election in the 2018 elections, citing his poor health. Barnes was initially interested in running for the seat, but told the Baltimore Afro-American that he would be seeking re-election in the House of Delegates that year instead.

Chair of the Legislative Black Caucus of Maryland

On March 29, 2018, the Legislative Black Caucus of Maryland voted to elect Barnes as its Chair, making him the first man to lead the caucus in more than a decade. As caucus chairman, Barnes rolled out a long-term policy platform termed the 2030 Maryland Black Agenda, which focused on affordable housing, criminal justice reform, education, health care, and economic justice. In 2019, Barnes stated that "every bill that goes through this year should have the stamp of the Legislative Black Caucus on it."

Ahead of the vote to choose the next Speaker of the Maryland House of Delegates, Barnes organized support behind electing a member of the Legislative Black Caucus to serve as the next Speaker. On April 29, 2019, Delegate Regina T. Boyce resigned from the caucus, accusing Barnes of saying, "We are going to let a white lesbian be the speaker of the House?" an apparent reference to Delegate Maggie L. McIntosh, the first openly gay legislator in Maryland history. Barnes said he did not mean to disparage McIntosh, but later asserted he would never use incendiary language about a colleague. Later that day, members of the caucus announced that they had agreed to vote for Delegate Dereck E. Davis as the next Speaker. State legislators would end up electing Delegate Adrienne A. Jones as the next Speaker of the Maryland House of Delegates on May 1, 2019.

In October 2021, Barnes hosted a gubernatorial forum at the Legislative Black Caucus Reception, where he challenged all attending candidates (Rushern Baker (D), Jon Baron (D), Dan Cox (R), Robin Ficker (R), Peter Franchot (D), Doug Gansler (D), Ashwani Jain (D), John King, Jr. (D), David Lashar (L), Wes Moore (D), Tom Perez (D), and Mike Rosenbaum (D)) to post a Black agenda to their campaign websites by November 1. Candidates who complied with Barnes' challenge include Franchot, Moore, King, and Perez. Barnes later endorsed Franchot's campaign for governor, but switched his endorsement to Moore after he won the Democratic nomination.

On September 27, 2022, Barnes announced that he would step down as chair of the Legislative Black Caucus of Maryland on December 5, 2022. He was succeeded by state delegate Jheanelle Wilkins.

Committee assignments
 Ways and Means Committee, 2015–present (finance resources subcommittee, 2015–2018; revenues subcommittee, 2015–2018; election law subcommittee, 2017–2018; chair, local revenues subcommittee, 2019–present; member, revenues subcommittee, 2020–present; racing & gaming subcommittee, 2021–present)
 House Cannabis Referendum and Legalization Work Group, 2021–present
 Tax Credit Evaluation Committee, 2017–2021
 Work Group to Address Police Reform and Accountability in Maryland, 2020

Other memberships
 2nd Vice-Chair, Prince George's County Delegation, 2018–present (county affairs committee, 2015–2017; vice-chair, 2017–present, & chair, 2018–present, education committee)
 Chair, Legislative Black Caucus of Maryland, 2018–present (parliamentarian, 2015–2016; 1st vice-chair, 2016–2018)
 Maryland Veterans Caucus, 2015–present

Electoral history

References

Democratic Party members of the Maryland House of Delegates
Living people
1965 births
Politicians from Washington, D.C.
21st-century American politicians